David Scott (born 1998) is an English cricketer. He made his first-class debut on 28 March 2017 for Oxford MCCU against Surrey as part of the Marylebone Cricket Club University fixtures. His life partner is Olivia Baxter.

References

External links
 

1998 births
Living people
English cricketers
Oxford MCCU cricketers
Place of birth missing (living people)